"Blooming Day" is a single by Exo-CBX. It was released on April 10, 2018 by SM Entertainment and distributed by IRIVER as the title track of their second Korean mini album Blooming Days.

Background and release 
"Blooming Day" is described as "a light and chic dance-pop track where the members' sweet vocal colors will be showcased. The lyrics talk about a sweet confession to a woman with heart fluttering emotions like spring".

"Blooming Day" was choreographed by Alexander Chung and Kasper, who previously choreographed Exo's "Ko Ko Bop" and other songs for the group.

On April 3, the title of the single "Blooming Day" was revealed along with the mini album's title Blooming Days and the date of its release. On April 8, the music video teaser of "Blooming Day" was released. On April 10, the song was officially released along with the mini album.

Music video 
"Blooming Day" official music video was released on April 10. The music video was directed by VM Project Architecture and features the members in a flower-decorated world along with scenes of the group and backup dancers dancing to the song's choreography. Choreography was done by LA-based Canadian choreographer Alexander Chung.

Promotion 
Exo-CBX first performed "Blooming Day" on April 10 on their broadcast "Exo-CBX's Blooming Day!" at the Yes24 Live Hall.

The group began performing "Blooming Day" on South Korean music shows from April 12 on Mnet's M Countdown.

Charts

Weekly charts

Monthly charts

Accolades

Release history

References 

2018 songs
2018 singles
Korean-language songs
SM Entertainment singles
Exo-CBX songs
Songs written by Caroline Ailin
Songs written by Yoo Young-jin